Nodozana rhodosticta is a moth of the subfamily Arctiinae. It was described by Arthur Gardiner Butler in 1878. It is found in the Brazilian states of Amazonas and São Paulo.

References

Lithosiini
Moths described in 1878